Jacob Christian Montes (born October 20, 1998) is an American professional soccer player who plays as a midfielder for Campeonato Brasileiro Série A club Botafogo.

Club career

Portland Timbers 
Montes began his career with the FC Florida Prep Academy, whose alumni includes Julian Gressel and Niko Hämäläinen. In October 2015, he trialled with English side Manchester United, and in February 2016, he spent a week with German club Borussia Dortmund.

In 2016, he joined the Portland Timbers Academy. Montes scored eight goals in 25 games for the Under-17/18 team and was subsequently signed to United Soccer League side Portland Timbers 2. He made his professional debut on March 25, 2017 as a 73rd minute substitute in a 2-1 loss to Real Monarchs. Montes made a further seven appearances and was named the Timbers' 2017 Academy Player of the Year.

Georgetown University 
After one season with the Timbers, he opted to play college soccer at Georgetown University for four years. In 2019, he scored 11 goals as he captained the team to its first NCAA National Championship. With a further five assists, he was named Big East Conference Midfielder of the Year. Montes rejected multiple contract offers from the Portland Timbers during his collegiate career.

In March 2021, Montes completed a trial with an undisclosed Premier League team who had been tracking him for several months. A month later, he opted out of pre-season training and notified Major League Soccer that he did not intend to play professionally in the United States for the 2021 season. On May 20, his MLS rights were made available to other clubs following the expiration of the Timbers' ownership, and later picked up by the New England Revolution.

Crystal Palace 
On May 25, it was announced that Montes would join Premier League side Crystal Palace on a one-year deal, subject to international clearance. He completed the move without being eligible for a British work visa, meaning he would have to leave the club temporarily on loan.

Belgian loans 
On July 31, 2021, Belgian First Division B Waasland-Beveren announced that they had acquired Montes from Crystal Palace on loan for one year, though this arrangement was ended in January 2022 and Montes joined another Belgian team, RWD Molenbeek, again on loan.

International career 
On October 7, 2016, Montes made his under-19 international debut for the United States in a 4–0 friendly victory against Liga MX side Club Tijuana. Montes is also eligible to play for Nicaragua through his paternal family. In March 2021, he discussed a potential call-up to the Nicaragua national team for the 2022 World Cup qualifiers later that month.

Career statistics

References

External links

1998 births
Living people
People from Lake Worth Beach, Florida
Soccer players from Florida
Sportspeople from the Miami metropolitan area
American soccer players
American people of Nicaraguan descent
Association football midfielders
USL Championship players
USL League Two players
Challenger Pro League players
Campeonato Brasileiro Série A players
Georgetown Hoyas men's soccer players
Portland Timbers 2 players
Treasure Coast Tritons players
Crystal Palace F.C. players
S.K. Beveren players
RWDM47 players
Botafogo de Futebol e Regatas players
American expatriate sportspeople in Brazil
Expatriate footballers in Brazil